The Kresge Hearing Research Institute is an institute of Otolaryngology of the Department of Otolaryngology in the University of Michigan.

The research institute was officially opened in 1963 to investigate the human hearing and causes of deafness.

In 2005, the discovery of being able to regrow cochlea hair nerves in guinea pigs at KHRI made international news.

External links
 Kresge Hearing Research Institute Homepage

University of Michigan schools, colleges, and departments
1963 establishments in Michigan